The Spain men's national under-18 ice hockey team is the men's national under-18 ice hockey team of Spain. The team is controlled by the Spanish Ice Sports Federation, a member of the International Ice Hockey Federation. The team represents Spain at the IIHF World U18 Championships.

International competitions

IIHF World U18 Championships

1999: 1st in Division II Europe
2000: 8th in Division I Europe
2001: 3rd in Division III
2002: 3rd in Division III
2003: 5th in Division II Group A
2004: 4th in Division II Group A
2005: 4th in Division II Group A
2006: 6th in Division II Group A
2007: 1st in Division III
2008: 5th in Division II Group B

2009: 5th in Division II Group A
2010: 3rd in Division II Group B
2011: 4th in Division II Group B
2012: 3rd in Division II Group B
2013: 2nd in Division II Group B
2014: 2nd in Division II Group B
2015: 2nd in Division II Group B
2016: 2nd in Division II Group B
2017: 2nd in Division II Group B

External links
Spain at IIHF.com

Ice hockey in Spain
National under-18 ice hockey teams
Ice hockey